Rui de Sá served as the representative of the Popular Movement for the Liberation of Angola (MPLA) to Egypt in the 1970s.

References

Angolan diplomats
Possibly living people
Year of birth missing (living people)
MPLA politicians